George Slicker is a former professional rugby league footballer who played in the 1990s. He played at representative level for Ireland, and at club level for Halifax (Heritage № 1085).

International honours
George Slicker won a cap for Ireland while at Halifax 1995 1-cap plus 1 as substitute.

References

Ireland national rugby league team players
Living people
Halifax R.L.F.C. players
Place of birth missing (living people)
Year of birth missing (living people)